Wall Street Trader 2000, known in Europe as Wall Street Trader 99, is a video game developed by Monte Cristo Multimedia and published by Interplay for Windows in 1999. It is the third game in the Wall Street Trader series.

Reception

The game received average reviews according to the review aggregation website GameRankings. Adam Pavlacka of NextGen said, "If you've ever wanted to play the stock market but never had the cash, this is the game for you. Featuring a minimalist interface, basic point-and-click controls, and a detailed economic model, Wall Street Trader 2000 is very close to the real thing – except you aren't risking real money."

References

External links
 

1999 video games
Business simulation games
Interplay Entertainment games
Video games developed in France
Windows games
Windows-only games